Margina is a commune in Timiș County, Romania. It is composed of nine villages: Breazova, Bulza, Coșevița, Coșteiu de Sus, Groși, Margina (commune seat), Nemeșești, Sintești and Zorani.

Geography 

Flora 
The vegetation consists of forests, secondary meadows, floodplain meadows, trees and agricultural crops. The most important species of trees found in the forests of the commune are beech, sessile oak, pedunculate oak, Hungarian oak, Turkey oak, hornbeam, black locust, linden (especially in the forests of Coșteiu de Sus and Groși), elm, birch, wild pear, crab apple, wild cherry and pine plantations. At the edge of the forest grow hazels, cornels, dogwoods, dog roses and other shrubs.

Fauna 
The forest wildlife is very varied. Characteristic species include the lynx (Lynx lynx) and the squirrel (Sciurus spp.), which, although it lives in coniferous forests, descends into beech and sessile oak forests. Forests are also home to badgers (Meles meles), red foxes (Vulpes vulpes) and wolves (Canis lupus). The wild boar (Sus scrofa) is quite widespread in the forests of the commune, it descends for food to the vicinity of households and causes significant damage to wheat and corn fields. An increasing number of deers and stags are found in the forests, which also descend for food to people's homes. Brown rats, shrews, harvest mice and susliks inhabit the cornfields and hayfields.

Birds are varied and widespread throughout the area: non-predatory birds of hunting interest (pheasants and partridges), birds of prey (hawks, crows and magpies) and migratory birds (storks, cuckoos, turtle doves, larks, nightingales, hoopoes, blackbirds and tits). In the forest and meadows also live: woodpeckers, white wagtails, hazel grouses, little owls, eagle-owls, sparrows, etc.

Reptiles and batrachians are represented by: green lizard, sand lizard, grass snake, dice snake, salamander, toad, marsh frog, tree frog and, rarely, a few turtle specimens.

Along the Bega River there are different fish such as nases and chubs, and on the sandy bottom of the river there are barbels; sometimes trouts also wander on the middle course of the river.

History 

The first recorded mention of Margina dates from 1365, but it is mentioned even before 1300 as the seat of a Vlach district belonging sometimes to Hunyad County and sometimes to Temes County. In the Middle Ages it played an important role in the area; here there was a fortress, first mentioned in 1439 and disputed by the lords of the time. In 1551 the fortress was demolished by John Török, but was rebuilt three years later. The Turks occupied Margina for a time, until it was liberated by Sigismund Báthory. In 1658, as a result of the political interests of Ákos Barcsay, Margina was ceded to the Turks, who ruled it for 30 years. 

After the Treaty of Passarowitz, the old fortresses of Banat are demolished. The ruins of the fortress of Margina were still visible at the end of the 18th century. The settlement continued its existence under the Austrians, as a settlement located on the border of Banat with Transylvania. In 1734, the Romanian wooden church was built, which still exists today and is a national historical monument.

At the end of the 18th century, Germans and Hungarians settled here, brought as officials or workers in the vinegar factory, one of the largest in Europe at that time. Up until 1930 the factory produced acetone and then vinegar and canned cucumbers and pickles. Because of the transition to state socialism during 1945 and 1947 it was closed, before being nationalized in 1948. During the 1960s–1970s it employed over 700 people. The factory closed permanently in 1998.

Demographics 

Margina had a population of 2,186 inhabitants at the 2011 census, down 7% from the 2002 census. Most inhabitants are Romanians (92.96%), larger minorities being represented by Ukrainians (2.2%) and Hungarians (1.1%). For 2.65% of the population, ethnicity is unknown. By religion, most inhabitants are Orthodox (74.06%), but there are also minorities of Pentecostals (13.86%), Baptists (5.54%), Roman Catholics (1.37%) and Adventists (1.19%). For 2.47% of the population, religious affiliation is unknown.

Gallery

References 

Communes in Timiș County
Localities in Romanian Banat